The Military Band Service of the Armed Forces of Turkmenistan is the primary military band organization of the Armed Forces of Turkmenistan. Many of the members of bands have attended the Turkmen National Conservatory. It is organized under the command of the Ministry of Defense of Turkmenistan.

Bands in the service are affiliated with the following units:

Ashgabat Garrison
Türkmenabat Garrison
Serdar Garrison
Ahal Garrison
Mary Garrison
Central Commanders' House
Military Institute of the Ministry of Defense

The Armed Forces Exemplary Band (known officially as Military Unit 20016) was formed in 1992 in Ashgabat based on the Band of the 52nd Army of the Soviet Union's Turkestan Military District.

Role of the Göreldeli Band in the Turkmen Armed Forces
The band's task is purely ceremonial in purpose, with its primary role being to play the State Anthem of Turkmenistan during solemn occasions. It is similar in style to college marching bands in the United States, as well as marching bands located in Russia. The massed bands of the military band service are notable for their finale performance at military parades in the capital, in which they work together to form specific shapes and Turkmen symbols.

The band takes part in the following events:

 The band also takes part in state welcoming ceremonies with the guard of honour at the Oguzkhan Presidential Palace and the defense ministry.
 Turkmen Independence Day Parade
 Awards ceremonies hosted by the President of Turkmenistan in honor of distinguished Turkmen citizens.
 Graduation ceremonies at military academies
 Concerts involving the band with, on some occasions, foreign military bands and or Turkmen singers/artists.
 Public musical festivals and military tattoos held on Turkmen and foreign soil.

The band performed at the first Victory Day Parade in the country in 2020, on the occasion of the 75th anniversary of the defeat of Nazi Germany. During the parade, it performed traditional Russian pieces such as Den Pobedy, Katyusha, and The Sacred War.

The band is led by Major Muhammet Akmuhammedowyň.

Holidays
 January 28 – Defender of the Fatherland Day
 May 9 – Victory Day
 May 18 – State Flag and Constitution Day
 September 27 – Independence Day
 October 6 – Day of Commemoration and National Mourning 
 October 9 – Day of the Navy

Instrumentation 

The combined bands, as well as the individual bands in the service are different from their Russian and Central Asian counterparts in that they put wind instruments such as the Clarinet in the front of the band, whereas other bands in the region prioritizes trumpets over others. Inspired by U.S. college bands, the band maintains a group of musicians with Tenor drums and Cymbal who are arranged in a formation similar to Drumlines. Other than traditional brass and wind instruments, the band also uses traditional Turkmen instruments, such as the Dutar and the Gijak. These instruments allow it to perform traditional music such as Kushtdepdi.

Some of the ceremonial music that the service utilizes includes the Presidential Fanfare, Niyazov's Honour March and Slow March of the Turkmen Flag (usually played during military parades during a flag procession). Öňe, diňe öňe, jan Watanym Türkmenistan, which was penned by President Gurbanguly Berdimuhamedow, is also in the band's repertoire.

Gallery

See also 
 Military Band Service (Kazakhstan)
 Band of the Ministry of Defense of the Republic of Uzbekistan
 Independent Honor Guard Battalion of the Ministry of Defence of Turkmenistan

Audio 
 Slow March
 Slow March of the Turkmen Flag
 Turkmen Presidential Fanfare

References 

Military bands
Military units and formations of Turkmenistan
Military units and formations established in 1992
1992 establishments in Turkmenistan